A list by year of films produced in Senegal, many in the French language:

External links
 Senegalese film at the African Film Festival
 Senegalese film at the Internet Movie Database

Senegal

Films